Tiny Tim may refer to:

People
 Tiny Tim (musician) (1932–1996), American musician best known for his cover of "Tiptoe Through the Tulips" in 1968
 Tiny Tim, nickname for Australian football (soccer) player Tim Cahill (born 1979)

Arts, entertainment, and media

 Tiny Tim (A Christmas Carol), a fictional character from the 1843 Charles Dickens novella A Christmas Carol
 Tiny Tim (comic strip), an American comic strip that ran from 1933 to 1958
 Tiny Tim, from The Topper comic strip
 Tiny Tim, the eponymous baby from the American schoolyard rhyme "Miss Lucy had a baby"

Other uses
 Tiny Tim (rocket), an anti-ship rocket deployed by the United States Navy at the end of World War II
 Tiny Tim (tomato), a dwarf tomato cultivar

See also

 Tinytim (disambiguation)
 Tiny (disambiguation)
 Tinny Tim